Hydrocarboniphaga effusa is a bacterium from the genus of Hydrocarboniphaga which has been isolated from  soil from New Jersey in the United States.

References

Bacteria described in 2004
Gammaproteobacteria